Kingdom of Gifts is a 1978 British animated film directed by Ted Kneeland, who co-wrote the screenplay with Jo Anna Kneeland. The score was composed by Mario Braggiotti.

Cast
Gemma Craven – The Unhappy Princess 
Douglas Fairbanks Jr. – The Proud King
Peter Sellers – The Slightly Larcenous Mayor 
Terry-Thomas – The Bumbling Chancellor

References

External links
 

1978 films
British animated films
1970s British films